As of 2019, there are 27 zoos in 21 countries outside of mainland China (Australia, Austria, Belgium, Canada, Denmark, Finland, France, Germany, Qatar, Indonesia, Japan, Malaysia, Mexico, the Netherlands, Scotland, Singapore, South Korea, Spain, Russia, Taiwan, Thailand, and United States) that have giant pandas. These zoos have contracts with China to house these pandas for a few years. An exception are the three pandas held at Taipei Zoo, which are owned by the Taiwanese government. Giant pandas are on the IUCN Red List so part of the reason these contracts exist between China and international zoos is to try to help the species reproduce before they are brought back to their native land. For this reason, pandas are treated very well.

Europe

Germany 

In Berlin Zoo, Berlin, Bao Bao (1978–2012) was one of the first two giant pandas in Germany and became—for a time—the oldest known panda in zoos. He was together with the female panda Tjen Tjen (who died in 1984) given to West Germany by China in 1980. Between 1991 and 1993 Bao Bao was loaned to London Zoo. In 1995, back in his Berlin home, another female named Yan Yan was sent on loan from China in an attempt to mate Bao Bao. In spite of several artificial insemination experiments there were no offspring. Yan Yan died in 2007. In summer 2017, giant pandas returned to Berlin, when Jiao Quing and Meng Meng arrived on breeding loan from China. In September 2019, Meng Meng gave birth to twin panda cubs.

France 

ZooParc de Beauval, Saint-Aignan, Loir-et-Cher, France is home to Huan Huan (F) and Yuan Zi (M) since 15 January 2012. She gave birth to two cubs in 2017 but only one survived, Yuan Meng. She also gave birth to two other cubs in 2021: Petite Neige and Fleur de Coton. Both of them can be seen through a live camera in the zoo.

Belgium 
Belgian zoo Pairi Daiza hosts five giant pandas; Hao Hao and Xing Hui since April 2014. Tian Bao was born in Pairi Daiza in 2016; he is the baby of Hao Hao and Xing Hui. In 2019, Hao Hao gave birth to a male and a female.

Scotland 
Tian Tian and Yang Guang are the pandas that are housed in Edinburgh Zoo in the UK. They live in  275,000 pounds suites and have organic food flown in from the Continent. They are on loan from China and will return in 2023. "Tian Tian and Yang Guang have been put in enclosures designed by animal psychologists, which come complete with dens, private pools, a viewing platform and a room where the pandas will be given health check-ups."
In their new habitats, each panda has a climbing frame that will enable them to see each other over the tops of their enclosures. The design of the habitat is to resemble their natural habitat in the wild. They have caves to sleep in and rocks where they can lie.

Austria 
The former elephant enclosure became the Panda House at the Tiergarten Schönbrunn Zoo with well-structured grounds (1015 m2) adapted. These pandas are also fed a nutritious diet, and provided with proactive medical care and a dedicated nurse team—one of the most important aspects of the panda attitude. Air-conditioning and a fog machine were installed in their habitat to keep the pandas safe and happy on hot summer days.

Finland 
Finnish Ähtäri Zoo also hosts two giant pandas named Lumi (F) and Pyry (M). They arrived in Finland 18 January 2018 and opened for public 17 February, after one month of quarantine. They were named after the snowstorm that prevailed at the time they arrived in Finland. Lumi means snow in Finnish, while Pyry is the equivalent of snowfall.

Spain 
The Zoo Aquarium in Madrid is the home of Bing Xing (M) and Hua Zuiba (F), since 2007. They gave birth to twin cubs on 7 September 2010. Another cub, Xing Bao (F), was born in 2013 and in September 2016 Chulina (F). The zoo was also the site of the first giant panda birth in Europe, Chulin (M) in 1982 whose parents, Shao Shao (F) and Chang Chang (M), arrived in 1978. Chulin (M, 1982) was the first panda to be born in captivity in the western hemisphere by artificial insemination

Denmark 
On 4 April 2019 Copenhagen Zoo received two pandas, Xing Er, and Mao Sun. The pandas live in a brand new enclosure designed by Bjarke Ingels Group and civil engineer company MOE.

Netherlands 
The Dutch Zoo Ouwehands Dierenpark houses two giant pandas named Xing Ya and Wu Wen. They live in a 3,400-meter2 Chinese-style enclosure. Wu Wen gave birth to a cub on 1 May 2020.

Russia 
Since 2019, Moskovsky Zoopark in Moscow houses the two giant pandas Ru Yi and Ding Ding.

Australia

Adelaide Zoo in Australia houses two pandas, Wang Wang and Funi, who were earlier loaned from China. They were loaned to Australia in 2009. They live together as male and female but also live with six red pandas. Space was created to provide comfort for the pandas but do not have the exhibit so big that the panda species would not be able to interact. In each inside room, there is "deep litter" which is a type of mulch to provide a clean inside for the pandas to live in.

The landscape of the exhibit was designed to mirror the native home of the two pandas, China. The giant panda exhibit is over 3,000 square meters and gives the pandas the options such as moving outside to lie on cool rocks or to bath in waterfalls. The two pandas that the Adelaide Zoo in Australia holds also have the option of staying inside in either air-conditioned rooms or in more natural caves to provide comfort for the pandas. The exhibit also has new 24-hour closed-circuit television to observe the pandas and how they interact with one another as well as other species in the exhibit. There is also a public viewing terrace under a bamboo canopy to accommodate the crowds but also to manage the privacy of the pandas. The zoo has specialist keepers just for the pandas as well as vets on hand at the zoo to make sure the pandas are well taken care of and protected.

Asia

Mainland China 
The wild giant panda population in China is no longer endangered, with a population in the wild exceeding 1,800 according to the fourth wild giant panda population investigation. Around 75% of these pandas are found in Sichuan province, inhabiting 49 counties across Sichuan, Shaanxi, and Gansu provinces within a habitat area of 2.58 million hectares. To protect the wild population, China established 67 natural reserves for giant pandas, covering 53.8% of their habitat and 66.8% of the wild population. As of the end of 2020, there were 633 captive giant pandas, and 11 of them have been successfully reintroduced into the wild, with 9 surviving. These conservation efforts are crucial for the survival and long-term sustainability of the giant panda species.

Singapore 
The largest panda exhibit built in Southeast Asia, this exhibit spans 1,500m2. Simulating the bears’ natural habitat with lush plantings, boulders, and water features, the state-of-the-art biodome is also temperature- and humidity-controlled to ensure the pandas’ comfort. River Safari has two pandas named Kai Kai and Jia Jia on a 10 year loan. On 14 August 2021, Jia Jia successfully gave birth to a panda cub named Le Le.

Taiwan 
Tuan Tuan and Yuan Yuan were sent by mainland China to Taiwan in 2008 as part of an exchange program. The couple has two cubs, Yuan Zai, born in 2013, and Yuan Bao, born in 2020. The two pandas were given to Taiwan rather than leased, thus them and their offspring are Taiwanese-owned. Tuan Tuan died in 2022.

South Korea 
Ai Bao (lovely treasure) and Le Bao (pleasant treasure) were sent by President Xi Jinping to South Korea in 2016 as a state gift. Ai Bao naturally conceived and gave birth to Fu Bao (happy treasure) on 20 July 2020. Fubao is the first panda to be born in Korea. The family currently resides in Everland, a popular theme park in Korea. Fu Bao received global attention when a video of her went viral on Youtube.

Japan 
Ri Ri and Shin Shin joined Japan's oldest zoo, Ueno Zoo, in 2011. In 2012, they had a baby panda who did not survive long. But in 2016, Shin Shin gave birth to Xiang Xiang. After nearly four years, the couple were found mating again, and in 2021 Shin Shin delivered twins, Xiao Xiao and Ray Ray. Ueno first exhibited pandas in 1972-1973 (Kang Kang and Lang Lang arrived in Tokyo to establish diplomatic relations with China and Japan, only for a temporary exhibition), and first bred them in 1986.

Malaysia 
Liang Liang and Xing Xing were sent to Zoo Negara, Malaysia on 21 May 2014 under the Giant Panda International Conservation Cooperation Agreement Programme. The agreement requires all giant panda cubs to be returned to China once they reach between 24 months and four years old. As of 2021, three panda cubs have been born in Zoo Negara—Nuan Nuan (born 18 August 2015), Yi Yi (born 14 January 2018) and Sheng Yi (born 31 May 2021).

Indonesia 
Cai Tao and Hu Chun were introduced to Taman Safari Indonesia in September 2017. Cai Tao and Hu Chun were born at the Bifengxia Panda Base in Bifengxia, Ya'an, Sichuan, China. The arrival process of Cai Tao and Hu Chun had been carried out for a long time, marked by the construction of the "Panda Palace" which would later become their home in Taman Safari. Cai Tao and Hu Chun have travelled more than 4,400 kilometres, taking off from Shuangliu International Airport in Chengdu, China on 28 September 2017, travelling five and a half hours until arriving at Soekarno–Hatta International Airport. After undergoing an adjustment period of approximately two months, the two of them finally began to be displayed in November 2017.

North America

United States 
Zoo Atlanta has several giant pandas being loaned from China. The loan fee that the zoo pays goes towards the conservation of giant pandas. The zoo itself has given over ten million dollars for giant panda conservation. Their projects include infrastructure, research, and management.

In April 2003, the Memphis Zoo became one of only four U.S. zoos to exhibit the giant panda. One male and one female giant panda ("Ya Ya" and "Le Le") share their 3-acre (1.2 ha) home with several other species native to China, in the first Memphis Zoo exhibit to be built as a zoogeographical exhibit. The buildings, plant life and even the sounds of China are represented in this $16 million exhibit. On February 3, 2023, the Memphis Zoo announced that Le Le had passed away at 25 years old.

At the Smithsonian National Zoological Park, zookeepers provide various forms of enrichment to their giant pandas and switch up their routine. They provide honey, apples, and leaf-eater biscuits inside the panda toys. The toys are usually made of plastic, rubber, and bamboo to ensure that the pandas don't break the toys too easily. Giant Pandas are allowed to play with water bottles, burlap bags, blankets, boxes, and fruitsicles—frozen fruit juice and water with cut-up fruit inside. The exhibit itself includes a room with a waterfall and rocky outcrop, a den, and several sustainable design features. There are green roofs, a solar hot water system, and natural material for the visitor paths. Not only is the exhibit sustainable, but it also creates an environment that allows for the pandas to stay at a cool temperature when it is hot outside while providing areas for privacy. Short trees, shrubs, pools, and streams, allow them to stay comfortable at all times. The National Zoo has had 4 cubs:  Tai Shan, Bao Bao and Bei Bei, who all live in China (Bei Bei was sent to China on 19 November 2019.)  The 4th, born 21 August 2020 is named Xiao Qi Ji (Mandarin Chinese for "Little Miracle") born when his mother, Mei Xiang was 22—the oldest female panda in North America to give birth.

The San Diego Zoo had Giant Pandas on-loan from China from 1996–2019 as part of the breeding program that successfully boosted the Giant Panda from "endangered" to "vulnerable." The agreement for the San Diego Zoo to house the breeding pair of Bai Yun and Xiao Liwu ended in 2019, and the pandas have been set to be returned on 27 April. The San Diego Zoo has stated that it will try to negotiate with the Chinese government to renew the partnership.

Mexico 
The Chapultepec Zoo (Zoológico de Chapultepec) is one of the four zoos of Mexico City, and it is especially famous for its success in giant panda breeding; in 1980 Chapultepec Zoo became the first institution outside of China to successfully breed the previously endangered species in captivity.  The first bear born, Xeng-Li, lived only eight days after its 10 August birth but was accidentally smothered by its mother, Yin-Yin.

In total there have been eight live births at the zoo. The most famous panda to have lived at the zoo is Tohui (1981–1993). As of November 2019, the two female giant pandas who live at the zoo, Shuan Shuan (b. 1988) and Xin Xin (b. 1990), are the oldest Giant Pandas in captivity.

The pandas at Chapultepec are special in that China does not have ownership. The original pair was given to Mexico and subsequent pandas have all been born prior to the change in policy from gifting to loaning. Zoo officials have also come to an agreement with China that any new offspring born at Chapultepec will belong to China. However, these pandas will be allowed to stay at the zoo (in contrast to other institutions, where offspring have to be returned to China after reaching five years of age).

Canada 
Giant pandas Jia Yueyue and Jia Panpan were born to Er Shun and Da Mao at Toronto Zoo in Ontario. They were relocated to China in 2020 due to a bamboo shortage caused by supply chain issues after moving to the Calgary Zoo in Alberta. Prior to Jia Yueyue and Jia Panpan, the Assiniboine Park Zoo hosted the giant pandas Rong Rong and Chuan Chuan in the 1980s.

See also
 List of giant pandas
 List of individual bears

References

Giant pandas